Ivy I-Ming Liu is a Taiwanese and New Zealander statistician specializing in categorical and ordinal data. She works as an associate professor and as head of the School of Mathematics and Statistics at Victoria University of Wellington in New Zealand.

Biography
Liu is originally from Taiwan and has a master's degree from Iowa State University. She completed her Ph.D. in 1995 at the University of Florida under the supervision of Alan Agresti.

After returning to Taiwan to work at National Chung Hsing University, she came to the University of Waikato in February 1999 for a one-year visiting lectureship, before moving to Victoria University.

She initially chose to work in categorical data with the hope that she could collaborate with her husband, then studying sociology. However, he moved to different work before that hope could pan out. More specifically, her research has concerned differential item functioning, dimension reduction for data whose components have mixed types, and multiple response data (survey data in which respondents can provide multiple answers to a question).

References

External links
Home page

Year of birth missing (living people)
Living people
New Zealand statisticians
Taiwanese statisticians
Women statisticians
Iowa State University alumni
University of Florida alumni
Academic staff of the University of Waikato
Academic staff of the Victoria University of Wellington